Michael Joseph McNally (September 13, 1893 – May 29, 1965), nicknamed Minooka Mike, was an American professional baseball player, scout, manager and general manager. He played his final season with the Washington Senators.

McNally developed a close bond with his teammate Babe Ruth, first with the Red Sox and later with the Yankees. As Ruth's roommate with the Yankees, he became known as the boisterous slugger's babysitter and guardian during their off-field antics. After retiring as a player, McNally continued to work in baseball as a minor league manager and General Manager in the Cleveland Indians organization. He later was named the director of the Indians’ farm system where he became known for signing Rocky Colavito.

Baseball career
McNally was born in Minooka, Pennsylvania to Catherine Summeral and Patrick McNally and was a next-door neighbor to the four Major League O’Neill brothers. Both parents were born in County Mayo, Ireland. In 1921, he married Mary "Mae" Murray of South Scranton.

A clever reserve infielder and basically a line drive hitter, Mc Nally entered the majors in 1915 with the Boston Red Sox, playing for them five years before joining the New York Yankees (1921–24) and Washington Senators (1925). His most productive season came with the 1920 Red Sox, when he posted career-highs in games (93), runs (42), hits (80), stolen bases (13) and on-base percentage (.326), while hitting a .256 average.

In a 10-season career, McNally was a .238 hitter (257-for-1078) with 169 runs and 85 RBI in 492 games, including 16 doubles, six triples, one home run and 40 stolen bases. As an infielder, he made 415 appearances at second base (181), third base (167), shortstop (60) and first base (7), while posting a collective .951 fielding percentage.

McNally also played on five American League pennant winners, appearing in the World Series with Boston in 1916 and for New York in 1921 and 1922, though he did not play in the 1915 and 1923 Series. In nine appearances, he hit .200 (4-for-20) with one RBI, two stolen base, four runs, and stole home plate in Game One of 1921 Series.

He posted an 872–781 record for a .528 winning percentage, including four first places and the   New York–Penn League championship title with the Williamsport Grays. After that, he worked during almost two decades for the Cleveland Indians as a scout and farm club director.

McNally died in Bethlehem, Pennsylvania, at age 72 while visiting a niece.

Transactions
Dec. 15, 1920: Traded by the Boston Red Sox along with Harry Harper, Waite Hoyt, and Wally Schang to the New York Yankees in exchange for Muddy Ruel, Del Pratt, Sammy Vick, and Hank Thormahlen.
Dec. 10, 1924: Traded by the New York Yankees to the Boston Red Sox for Howie Shanks.
Dec. 11, 1924: Traded by the Boston Red Sox to the Washington Senators for Doc Prothro.

References

External links
Mike McNally - Baseballbiography.com
Baseball Reference

Boston Red Sox players
New York Yankees players
Washington Senators (1901–1960) players
Major League Baseball infielders
Minor league baseball managers
Baseball players from Pennsylvania
Cleveland Indians scouts
1893 births
1965 deaths
Utica Utes players
St. Paul Apostles players
Providence Grays (minor league) players
Binghamton Triplets managers
Binghamton Triplets players